Steag GmbH, the former "Steinkohlen-Elektrizität AG" ("Anthracite Electricity Company") is a German power company. As of 2022, it is Germany’s fifth largest utility. It operates also in the field of transport, processing and distribution of hard coal, coke and byproducts from coal processing, as also in the field of gas supply, transport and trading.

History
As a result of restructuring of RAG Group, STEAG became a part of Evonik Industries AG in September 2007. In 2014, the company was sold to holding company KSBG, which bundles the shares held by utilities in the western German municipalities of Duisburg, Dortmund, Bochum, Essen, Oberhausen and Dinslaken.

Business
The company operates eleven hard coal-fired power plants, of which eight are located in Germany, and one in Turkey, Colombia and Philippines. The plant in Turkey is joint owned with OYAK and is İsken Sugözü power station with STEAG holding 51%. It is on the Global coal exit list.

External links
 Company website

References

Electric power companies of Germany